Diana Victoria González Barrera (10 September 1993 – 1 November 2019) was a Mexican footballer who played as a midfielder. Her last team was Club América of Liga MX Femenil. She had been a member of the Mexico women's national under-17 team.

Career
González made her debut with Club América. At eight years old, she wished that in Mexico there was a professional soccer league for women equal to the manly one.

She debuted in the Liga MX Femenil on 23 July 2018 during a duel Club América vs Deportivo Toluca, being her first season in the 2018 Apertura Tournament (Mexico), in which she played seven games with a total of 526 minutes played. She scored four goals and received a yellow card.

In her second season, she played eleven games with a total of 670 minutes of action, with a single goal scored and received two yellow cards. González suffered knee injury in a match against Pachuca, in which she scored her first goal of the tournament, leaving her unable to play for six months.

She was in 2017 at the Telmex Telcel Championship, and in 2018 she was at the Telmex Telcel University Championship, where her team had won.

After many rumors and expectations in her hometown on 22 September 2017, she was presented by the 2018 opening before the UANL Tigers, however she trained with America looking for a position for a foreigner position in the first team.

International career
González represented Mexico at the 2010 FIFA U-17 Women's World Cup.

Death
González died on 1 November 2019 due to a decompensation in glucose levels after suffering hypoglycemia, she was 26 years old. She was the first player who had been featured in the Liga MX Femenil to die.

References

External links 
 

1993 births
2019 deaths
Mexican women's footballers
Footballers from the State of Mexico
People from Toluca
Liga MX Femenil players
Club América (women) footballers
Deaths from diabetes
Women's association football midfielders
Mexican footballers